Nurmes is a town and municipality of Finland, located in the county of North Karelia.
is water. Neighbouring municipalities are Juuka, Kuhmo, Lieksa, Rautavaara, Sotkamo and Valtimo.

Nurmes railway station is the northern terminus of a twice-daily VR passenger train service from Joensuu. The service has been under threat of closure but is currently part of rail services that the Ministry of Transport and Communications requires VR to run in exchange for its monopoly on more attractive routes. The agreement is currently valid through 2030.

Karelian village and spa hotel Break Sokos Hotel Bomba are situated in Nurmes. Bomba Karelian Village is a tourist destination for Karelian construction and food culture and traditions. Hotel Hyvärilä Youth and Holiday Centre, and Pielis-Golf golf course are located near the Bomba area.

Karelian nest
The municipality is officially unilingually Finnish, but in 2009, Finland's first Karelian language "nest" (pre-school immersion group) was established in Nurmes.

Geography 
Nurmes is located in Finnish Karelia on the shore of lake Pielinen, next to the counties of Kainuu and Northern Savonia. The nearest major cities by road are Kuopio (128 km), Joensuu (127 km) and Kajaani (113 km) where the nearest airports are located. The railway from Nurmes to Joensuu is 160 km and runs through Lieksa. Helsinki is 518 kilometers by road and can be reached by rail by changing from train from Joensuu. Nurmes is close to Tahko Tourist Center (93 km), Vuokatti Ski Resort (88 km), Koli National Park (78 km), Tiilikkajärvi National Park (56 km) and Hiidenportti National Park (44 km).

Nurmes experiences a continental climate with four seasons. Winters are cold and the average temperature from November to March is below -5 °C. On average, the snow season lasts 4–5 months from November to April. North Karelia is one of the snowiest regions in Finland, with a typical March snow depth of more than 50 cm. During the darkest time of the year, the sun is above the horizon for about four hours.

Summers are cool to warm and temperatures change very rapidly during the summer. During the brightest time of the year, the sun is above the horizon for about 20 hours.

The nature of Nurmes is characterized by hilly landscapes, forests and lakes. There are 409 lakes in Nurmes. The largest and the most famous of these is lake Pielinen. Species such as perch, grayling, pike, lake salmon, whitefish, lake trout are found in Pielinen. Fishing is possible with a licence that can be bought from shops.

There are three hiking areas in Nurmes:

 Raesärkkä area consists of a 5.9 km2 protected forest and a 1.2 km2 recreational forest. It has a grazing field, marshes, lakes and rivers. 
 Mujejärvi area consists of a 20 km2 hiking area with cliffs, ridges, gorges and lakes.
 Lake Peurajärvi is suitable for families with children and fishermen. There are many lakes, ponds and rivers in the area, with easy access routes.

There are many different mushroom, wild herb and berry species in the forests. There is Freedom to roam in Finland.

Economy 
Key industries of Nurmes are wood industry, food industry and metal and mechanical engineering.

Wood industry is the most significant industrial sector of our region in terms of turnover and employees. The products manufactured here include sawn and planed wood, glued beams, impregnated wooden poles, and high-quality special cardboards.

Nurmes has strong expertise in bakery, fish and meat processing sectors. The most sold signature products have been bread in various forms, and gluten-free bakery products.

Metal and mechanical engineering companies operate as subcontractors or manufacture products under their own trademarks. They develop innovative products & processes and search actively for new subcontracting opportunities.

Nurmes has Green Industry Area (Nurmes GIA) which is a novel business district that offers spacious plots, modern infrastructure, and good logistic services. Nurmes GIA is an excellent platform e.g. for manufacturing and logistics of bio-based chemical products. The areal zoning and environmental impact assessment have been designed to benefit the start-up of forest-based industries and circular economy.

Culture 
Nurmes was declared Finland's Christmas Song City in 2005 and the European Christmas Song City in 2009. A lot of musical activities, such as concerts and events, are organized during Christmas in Nurmes.

During the summertime there are cultural events, such as Nurmes Summer Music, which takes place in the beginning of July.

Finnish composer P. J. Hannikainen was from Nurmes, so a theatre, a street and a playschool are named after him. He has own monument in Nurmes city centre.

Nurmes-talo is the Nurmes Cultural Center, where library, cinema, art gallery and a museum take place. Nurmes-talo has been under renovation since June 2019 and will reopen on August 9th, 2021. There is another museum in Nurmes called Ikola museum.

Nurmes is the home town of the main protagonist of the acclaimed 2002 Aki Kaurismäki film Mies vailla menneisyyttä (The Man Without a Past).

Notable people
 Elli Saurio (1899–1966), Economist
 Mikko Collan, military officer and politician
 P. J. Hannikainen, composer
 Jani Hartikainen, football player
 Juha Holopainen, skier
 Ilkka Laitinen, military officer and government executive
 Pekka Meriläinen, stonemason and politician
 Urho Peltonen, javelin thrower
 Olli Soikkeli, jazz guitarist

International relations

Twin towns — Sister cities
Nurmes is twinned with:

  Laholm, Sweden
  Møn, Denmark
  Ørsta, Norway
  Volda, Norway
  Segezha, Russia

References

External links

Town of Nurmes – Official website

 
Populated lakeshore places in Finland
Cities and towns in Finland
Populated places established in 1810